"Brother Jukebox" is a song written by Paul Craft. It was originally recorded by Don Everly, one-half of The Everly Brothers, in 1977 and reached number 96 on the country singles charts. It was later covered by Keith Whitley on I Wonder Do You Think of Me and by Mark Chesnutt on his 1990 debut album Too Cold at Home. Released in November 1990 as the album's second single, it became his first Number One country hit in the United States. It was also recorded by John Starling on his 1977 album Long Time Gone.

Content
The song's narrator tells of a man whose after being left by his lover (it's unknown if she was his wife or girlfriend since the narrator said "since 'she' left me by myself"....) you're (addressing "brother jukebox", "sister wine", "mother freedom" and "father time") as the only family the narrator has got left in his life, his "new next of kin", to spend any time with at all.

Music video (Mark Chesnutt)
The music video was directed by Bill Young and premiered in late 1990.

Chart performance

Don Everly

Mark Chesnutt

Year-end charts

References

[ Allmusic]

1977 songs
1977 singles
1990 singles
Don Everly songs
Keith Whitley songs
Mark Chesnutt songs
Songs written by Paul Craft
Song recordings produced by Mark Wright (record producer)
MCA Records singles